The 2009 Jersey City non-partisan mayoral election occurred on May 12, 2009. Incumbent Mayor Jerramiah Healy (Democrat) won re-election.  Former Mayor Bret Schundler (Republican) was going to run, but dropped out in January 2009 for financial reasons. Healy needed a 51% vote to hold off a second round (like the 2004 and 2005 elections). Healy won the election with 53% vote against 4 other candidates. The voter turnout was only 30,658.

Democratic candidates

Announced
Jerramiah Healy, Incumbent Mayor 
L. Harvey Smith, Former Acting Mayor 
Louis Manzo, State Representative and Former Mayoral Candidate

Republican candidates

Declined
Bret Schundler, former Mayor (1992–2001)

Independent Candidates

Announced
Dan Levin, Activist and founder of CivicJC

Declined
Steven Fulop, Ward E Councilman

References

2009 New Jersey elections
Jersey City
2009